Koerner Rock is a small but conspicuous rock outcropping located  southwest of Cape Dubouzet and  southeast of Yagodina Knoll, Trinity Peninsula, Antarctica. It was named by the UK Antarctic Place-Names Committee for Roy M. Koerner, an assistant meteorologist and glaciologist with the Falkland Islands Dependencies Survey at Hope Bay, from 1957 to 1960.

Map
 Trinity Peninsula. Scale 1:250000 topographic map.  Institut für Angewandte Geodäsie and British Antarctic Survey, 1996.

References

Rock formations of the Trinity Peninsula